St. Philip's Episcopal Church is a historic Episcopal church located at 256 E. Main Street in Brevard, Transylvania County, North Carolina. It was designed by architect Louis Humbert Asbury and built in 1926.  It is a tall one-story, Normanesque Revival style stone structure on a nave plan, with a narthex/tower on the main elevation and a chancel on the rear.  It has a two-story bell tower and stained glass windows.

It was added to the National Register of Historic Places in 1997. It is located in the East Main Street Historic District.

References

Churches completed in 1926
20th-century Episcopal church buildings
Episcopal church buildings in North Carolina
Romanesque Revival architecture in North Carolina
Churches on the National Register of Historic Places in North Carolina
Buildings and structures in Transylvania County, North Carolina
National Register of Historic Places in Transylvania County, North Carolina
Historic district contributing properties in North Carolina